Pierre Pasquini (16 February 1921 in Sétif, Algeria - 2 March 2006 in Nice, France) was a French politician, who served as Minister of Veterans Affairs and Victims of War from 1995 to 1997.

References

1921 births
2006 deaths
French politicians
People from Sétif
French people of colonial Algeria